Lewis M. Simons (born January 9, 1939) is an American Pulitzer Prize-winning correspondent on foreign affairs throughout Southeast Asia and the Middle East.

Early life
A native of Paterson, Lewis Simons was raised in New Jersey.  For his post-secondary education, he attended New York University. Afterward, he attended  Columbia University Graduate School of Journalism, where he met his future wife Carol Lenore Seiderman. The couple married in 1965.

Career 
Simons began his journalistic career in 1964 as a reporter for the Associated Press. Specialized in Asia affairs, he has reported extensively on war, civil unrest, politics, and economics, visiting Pakistan, Afghanistan, Japan, South Korea, Malaysia, Singapore, Vietnam, Philippines. In 1971, he joined The Washington Post and served as a correspondent in India and Thailand for the next few years. Since 1982, Simone has worked as a correspondent for The Mercury News based in Tokyo. One of his projects during this period was a series of articles with correspondents Pete Carey and Catherine Ellison on the massive transfers of wealth abroad by the President of the Philippines Ferdinand Marcos and his associates. Being on Tokyo assignment in 1985, Simons  was investigating the circumstances of the death of the politician Benigno Aquino, when he came across the information about Marcos' financial affairs. In 1986, three correspondents were awarded the Pulitzer Prize for International Reporting. A year after, Lewis Simons published a book on the Philippine revolution "Worth Dying for". His other books are "The Next Front," co-authored with U.S. Sen. Christopher "Kit" Bond, and "To Tell The Truth."

Simons’ op-ed and analytical articles have appeared in The New York Times, The Washington Post, the Foreign Affairs, The Atlantic, and the Smithsonian magazine. In 1995, Lewis Simons and Michael Zielenziger were shortlisted for the Pulitzer Prize for "series on the growing economic and political influence of overseas Chinese on Asia". In co-author with the former United States Senator Christopher Samuel Bond, Simons published the book “The Next Front: Southeast Asia and the Road to Global Peace with Islam» in 2009. 

In 2012-2013, Simons held the endowed Snedden Chair at the University of Alaska Fairbanks Fairbanks. He and his wife currently reside in Washington, DC.
</ref>

Awards
Edward R. Murrow Fellow, Council on Foreign Relations (1970);
Distinguished Investigative Reporting Award, Investigative Reporters and Editors (1979);
Front Page Award (1979);
Citation for Excellence, Newspaper Guilt (1984);
Citation for Excellence, Overseas Press Club (1983);
Award for Excellence, World Affairs Council (1984, 1986, 1989, 1992);
George Polk Award (1985);
Grand Prize, Investigative Reporters and Editors (1986);
Jessie Meriton White Award (1986);
Overseas Press Club award (1987, 1992);
Gerald Loeb Award, Anderson Graduate School of Management (1993).

References

Books

 

1948 births
1995 deaths
Pulitzer Prize for International Reporting winners
American male journalists